Pablo Debran (1899 – December 1969) was a Swiss tennis player. He competed in the men's singles and doubles events at the 1924 Summer Olympics.

References

External links
 

1899 births
1969 deaths
Swiss male tennis players
Olympic tennis players of Switzerland
Tennis players at the 1924 Summer Olympics
Place of birth missing